Quartey-Papafio is a surname. Notable people with the surname include:

Benjamin Quartey-Papafio (1859–1924), Ghanaian physician and politician
Kate Quartey-Papafio, Ghanaian businesswoman
Mercy ffoulkes-Crabbe (1894–1974), Ghanaian teacher, daughter of Benjamin

Compound surnames